Warsaw City Council, officially the Council of the Capital City of Warsaw is a unicameral governing body of the city of Warsaw, the capital of Poland.

The council was first created following the location of Warsaw under the terms of the Magdeburg Law in the Middle Ages. The modern council is regulated by the Warsaw Act of 2002. It consists of 60 councillors elected in free elections for a five-year term. The current chairman of the council is Ewa Malinowska-Grupińska.

City Council 2018-2023

|-
!colspan="5"|
|-
! colspan="2" style="text-align:left;" | Parties
! Result of the 2018 Election
! As of 18 April 2021 
! Change
|-
| style="background-color:orange;" |
| style="text-align:left;" |Civic Coalition (Koalicja Obywatelska, KO)
| 40 
| 40
|  
|-
| style="background-color:blue;" |
| style="text-align:left;" | Law and Justice (Prawo i Sprawiedliwość, PiS)
| 19
| 18
|  1
|-
| style="background-color:red;" |
| style="text-align:left;" | Democratic Left Alliance (Sojusz Lewicy Demokratycznej, SLD)
| 1
| 0
|  1
|-
| style="background-color:#eeeeee;" |
| style="text-align:left;" | Independent
| 0
| 2
|  2
|-

|}
The chairman of the council is Ewa Malinowska-Grupińska.

City Council 2014-2018

|-
!colspan="3"|
|-
! colspan="2" style="text-align:left;" | Parties
! Seats
|-
| style="background-color:orange;" |
| style="text-align:left;" |Civic Platform (Platforma Obywatelska, PO)
| 33 
|-
| style="background-color:blue;" |
| style="text-align:left;" | Law and Justice (Prawo i Sprawiedliwość, PiS)
| 24
|-
| style="background-color:red;" |
| style="text-align:left;" | Democratic Left Alliance (Sojusz Lewicy Demokratycznej, SLD)
| 2
|-
| style="background-color:#eeeeee;" |
| style="text-align:left;" | Independent
| 1
|-
! colspan="2" style="text-align:left;" | Total
! style="text-align:center;" colspan="2"| 60
|}
The chairman of the council is Ewa Malinowska-Grupińska.

City Council 2010-2014

|-
!colspan="3"|
|-
! colspan="2" style="text-align:left;" | Parties
! Seats
|-
| style="background-color:orange;" |
| style="text-align:left;" |Civic Platform (Platforma Obywatelska, PO)
| 33 
|-
| style="background-color:blue;" |
| style="text-align:left;" | Law and Justice (Prawo i Sprawiedliwość, PiS)
| 17
|-
| style="background-color:red;" |
| style="text-align:left;" | Democratic Left Alliance (Sojusz Lewicy Demokratycznej, SLD)
| 10
|-
| style="background-color:#eeeeee;" |
| style="text-align:left;" | Independent
| 0
|-
! colspan="2" style="text-align:left;" | Total
! style="text-align:center;" colspan="2"| 60
|}
The chairman of the council is Ewa Malinowska-Grupińska.

City Council 2006-2010

|-
!colspan="3"|
|-
! colspan="2" style="text-align:left;" | Parties
! Seats
|-
| style="background-color:orange;" |
| style="text-align:left;" |Civic Platform (Platforma Obywatelska, PO)
| 27
|-
| style="background-color:blue;" |
| style="text-align:left;" | Law and Justice (Prawo i Sprawiedliwość, PiS)
| 22
|-
| style="background-color:red;" |
| style="text-align:left;" | The Left (Lewica)
| 11
|-
| style="background-color:#eeeeee;" |
| style="text-align:left;" | Independent
| 0
|-
! colspan="2" style="text-align:left;" | Total
! style="text-align:center;" colspan="2"| 60
|}
The chairman of the council is Ewa Malinowska-Grupińska (Lech Jaworski until 26 June 2007).

See also 

 Councillors in Warsaw

References

External links

City councils in Poland
City Council
City Council

pl:Ustrój miasta stołecznego Warszawy#Rada Warszawy